Majdevo is a village in the municipality of Kruševac, Serbia. According to the 2002 census, the village has a population of  491 people. The village's history includes the Minić villa, the old school and church of Sveta Petka. King Alexander I Karadjordjevic visited the village a number of times. The village is also notable for the first Serbian ethno film.

References

Populated places in Rasina District